James Zhang is an artist whose work has appeared in role-playing games.

Career
Zhang has done interior illustrations on a number of Dungeons & Dragons books for Wizards of the Coast, including Sharn: City of Towers (2004), the Eberron Campaign Setting (2004), Monster Manual III (2004), Races of the Wild (2005), Races of Eberron (2005), Five Nations (2005), Tome of Magic: Pact, Shadow, and Truename Magic (2006), Fiendish Codex II: Tyrants of the Nine Hells (2006), and Drow of the Underdark (2007).  He also did the cover art for Crucible of Chaos (2008) from Paizo Publishing's GameMaster line.

Zhang has also done artwork for the video game industry, including several games based on the Star Wars franchise.

Zhang was the founder and CEO of digital arts developer Concept Art House, backed by superangel Matthew Le Merle, and headquartered in San Francisco and Shanghai. Here, Zhang was the executive producer on the graphic novel series Daomu, an English language adaptation of a Chinese book series, for Image Comics.

References

External links
 Official site
 

Living people
Role-playing game artists
Year of birth missing (living people)